This is a list of Consorts of the Ottoman sultans, the wives and concubines of the monarchs of the Ottoman Empire who ruled over the transcontinental empire from its inception in 1299 to its dissolution in 1922.

Honorific and titles

Hatun 
Hatun was used as an honorific for women in the Ottoman period, roughly equivalent to the English term Lady. The term was being used for the Ottoman sultan's consorts. When the son of one of the consorts ascended the throne she became Valide Hatun (Mother of Sultan).

Sultan 
Sultan (سلطان) is a word of Arabic origin, originally meaning "authority" or "dominion". By the beginning of the 16th century, the title of sultan, carried by both men and women of the Ottoman dynasty, was replacing other titles by which prominent members of the imperial family had been known (notably hatun for women and bey for men), with imperial women carrying the title of "Sultan" after their given names. Consequently, the title "Valide Hatun" also turned into "Valide Sultan". In this time, the title "Haseki Sultan" was created and used for the legal wife or Chief Consort of the Ottoman Sultan. For example, Hafsa Sultan, Suleiman's mother and first valide sultan, and Hürrem Sultan, Suleiman's legal wife and first haseki sultan. This usage underlines the Ottoman conception of sovereign power as family prerogative. Towards the end of the seventeenth century the title hatun and sultan for imperial consorts was replaced by Kadın and Ikbal.

Kadın 
Kadın was the title given to the official wives of the Sultan of the Ottoman Empire. The title officially first came in use during the reign of Sultan Suleiman II. The Sultan could have up to four and some times five women i.e. wives with the imperial rank of Kadın and unlimited number of wives with the rank of Ikbal.

Ikbal 
Ikbal was the title given to the official consorts of the Sultan of the Ottoman Empire, who came below the rank of Kadın.

Consorts of the Ottoman sultans

See also
Ottoman dynasty
Ottoman Empire
List of mothers of the Ottoman sultans
List of Valide Sultans
List of Ottoman Sultans

Notes

Bala Hanım ve Malhun hanım
Necla Prenses

References
 Açba-Ançabadze, Leyla, Fürstin: Harem Hatıraları, Timaş Yayınları, Istanbul 2010.
 Afife Rezzemaza: Saray'dan Sürgüne, Istanbul 2013
 Aredba, Rumeysa, Fürstin: Sultan Vahdeddin'in San Remo Günleri, Istanbul 2009
 Bardakçı, Murat: Şahbaba. Pan Yayıncılık, Istanbul 1998.
 Mislimelek, Prinzessin: Saray'dan Sürgüne Bir Osmanlı Prensesi, Istanbul 2012 (Memoiren der Nichte von Emine Nazikeda und Schwiegertochter von Sultan Abdulhamit II.)
 Öztuna, Yılmaz: İslam Devletleri. Istanbul 1989 (Devletler ve Hanedanlar, Band 2).
 Uluçay, Çağatay: Padişahların Kadınları ve Kızları, Ankara 1992
 Ünüvar, Safiye: Saray Hatıraları, Istanbul 1965
 

Ottoman imperial harem
Consorts, Ottoman sultans
Consorts, Ottoman sultans
Lists of wives
Ottoman